Xanthodius is a genus of crabs in the family Xanthidae, containing one exclusively fossil species and the following extant species:

 Xanthodius americanus (Saussure, 1858)
 Xanthodius cooksoni (Miers, 1877)
 Xanthodius denticulatus (White, 1848)
 Xanthodius inaequalis (Olivier, 1791)
 Xanthodius sternberghii Stimpson, 1859
 Xanthodius stimpsoni (A. Milne Edwards, 1879)

References

Xanthoidea